Margaret Sutton is an American politician and Republican member of the South Dakota Senate since January 8, 2019.

Election history

2020     Sutton was re-elected with 7,205 votes defeating Nichole Cauwels received 4,261 votes.
2018     Sutton was elected with 5,240 votes defeating Rachel Willson with 3,558 votes.  Sutton defeated Spencer Wrightsman in the Republican primary with 772 votes and Wrightsman receiving 538 votes.

References 

Living people
Republican Party South Dakota state senators
Year of birth missing (living people)